Millerstown is an unincorporated community and census-designated place (CDP) in Blair County, Pennsylvania, United States. It was first listed as a CDP prior to the 2020 census.

The CDP is in southeastern Blair County, southeast of the center of North Woodbury Township, in the Morrisons Cove region of the county.

Middle Run flows eastward through the northern part of Millerstown. It is a tributary of Clover Creek, a northward-flowing tributary of the Frankstown Branch Juniata River.

Demographics

References 

Census-designated places in Blair County, Pennsylvania
Census-designated places in Pennsylvania